A referendum on insurance was held in Switzerland on 4 February 1912. Voters were asked whether they approved of a federal law on health and accident insurance. The proposal was approved by 54.4% of voters.

Background
The referendum was an optional referendum, which only a majority of the vote, as opposed to the mandatory referendums, which required a double majority; a majority of the popular vote and majority of the cantons.

Results

References

1912 referendums
1912 in Switzerland
Referendums in Switzerland